Pakin is an Armenian literary and cultural periodical published in Beirut, Lebanon since 1962.

Pakin may also refer to:
Pakin Atoll, small atoll lying off the northwest coast of Pohnpei in the Federated States of Micronesia
Andrei Pakin (born 1978), Kyrgystani swimmer